Karimuddin Bharsha was a Jatiya Party (Ershad) politician and the former Member of Parliament of Rangpur-1 & Rangpur-4.

Early life 
Bharsha was born in Haragache, Kaunia Upazila, Rangpur District.

Career
Bharsa was elected to parliament from Rangpur-1 as a Jatiya Party candidate in September 1991. The by-elections were called after Ershad, who was elected from five constituency including Rangpur-1, chose to resign and represent Rangpur-3. Bharsha was elected to parliament from Rangpur-4 as a Jatiya Party candidate in 1996 and 2001.

Death 
Bharsha died on 23 July 2022 in Evercare Hospital, Dhaka, Bangladesh.

References

Jatiya Party politicians
5th Jatiya Sangsad members
7th Jatiya Sangsad members
8th Jatiya Sangsad members
Year of birth missing
2022 deaths
People from Rangpur District